Concord Biotech Limited (CBL) is an Indian biotechnology company headquartered in Ahmedabad. The company manufactures fermentation based biopharmaceutical active pharmaceutical ingredients (APIs) sold worldwide.

Concord was founded in 2000 by Sudhir Vaid. From a single product company in 2000s, Concord today manufactures over 30 products across niche therapy segments such as immunosuppressant, oncology, antifungal and antibacterial. Concord Biotech is the first company in India and the second in the world to develop an anti-immuno suppressant tacrolimus. Its manufacturing facility in Ahmedabad is approved by global regulatory bodies including Food and Drug Administration (US) and Good manufacturing practice (EU).

Quadria Capital acquired a 20% stake in Concord Biotech in 2016. Rakesh Jhunjhunwala's Rare Enterprises holds 24% stake in Concord.

See also
Dr. Reddy's Laboratories
Wockhardt
Biocon

References 

Pharmaceutical companies of India
Biotechnology companies of India
Manufacturing companies based in Ahmedabad
2000 establishments in Gujarat
Indian companies established in 2000
Pharmaceutical companies established in 2000